The North Bay Jail is a jail located in North Bay, Ontario.

The 121-bed maximum-security facility houses male and female offenders awaiting trial, sentencing, transfer to federal and provincial correctional facilities, immigration hearings or deportation, or serving sentences under 120 days (4 months)

See also 
List of correctional facilities in Ontario

References

 

Prisons in Ontario
Buildings and structures in North Bay, Ontario